Barcroft Community House is a historic community center located at Arlington, Virginia.  It was built in 1908, and is a one-story, American Craftsman style frame building.  It initially served as a church building for the Methodist Episcopal Church. It housed the Barcroft School until a new school building opened in 1925. The building has served collectively as a church, school, and community meeting place since its construction.

The Arlington County Board designated the building to be a local historic district on January 7, 1984. The National Park Service listed the house on the National Register of Historic Places on July 28, 1995. The Arlington County government erected a historic marker near the house in 1999.

See also
 List of Arlington County Historic Districts

References

Event venues on the National Register of Historic Places in Virginia
Arlington County Historic Districts
Buildings and structures completed in 1908
Buildings and structures in Arlington County, Virginia
National Register of Historic Places in Arlington County, Virginia
1908 establishments in Virginia